Deh-e Karam Mazraeh (also Romanized as Deh-e Karam Mazra‘eh; also known as Deh-e Karam and Karam) is a village in Dust Mohammad Rural District, in the Central District of Hirmand County, Sistan and Baluchestan Province, Iran. At the 2006 census, its population was 157, in 33 families.

References 

Populated places in Hirmand County